The 2021–22 San Francisco Dons men's basketball team represented the University of San Francisco during the 2021–22 NCAA Division I men's basketball season. The Dons were led by third-year head coach Todd Golden, and played their home games at the War Memorial Gymnasium at the Sobrato Center as members of the West Coast Conference.

USF began the season at 10–0, which marked the program's best start to a season since they opened with 26 straight wins in 1976–77. The Dons' perfect season ended with a one-point loss to Grand Canyon on December 18; they would ultimately wrap up their non-conference slate with a 13–2 record heading into WCC play.

The Dons finished conference regular season play at 10–6 and were seeded fourth in that year's WCC tournament. After a win against BYU and a loss to Gonzaga, the Dons received an at-large NCAA tournament bid, their first appearance since 1998. They were placed as a tenth seed in the East region but lost in an overtime game to seventh seed Murray State 92–87. 

The day after the tournament loss, March 18, 2022, head coach Todd Golden accepted the head coach role at Florida. Chris Gerlufsen was subsequently named the next head coach.

Previous season
The Dons concluded the 2020–21 season 11–14, 4–9 in WCC play to finish in fifth place. They defeated San Diego in the first round of the WCC tournament before losing to Loyola Marymount.

Offseason

Departures

Incoming transfers

2021 recruiting class

2022 recruiting class

Roster

Source:

Schedule and results

|-
!colspan=9 style=| Non-conference regular season

|-
!colspan=9 style=| WCC regular season

|-
!colspan=9 style=| WCC tournament

|-
!colspan=9 style=| NCAA tournament

Source:

References

San Francisco Dons men's basketball seasons
San Francisco
San Francisco Dons
San Francisco Dons
2021 in San Francisco
2022 in San Francisco
San Francisco